Alfio Musmarra (born May 30, 1976 in Taurianova, Italy) is an Italian sports journalist and TV presenter of Qui studio a voi stadio.

References

1976 births
Journalists from Milan
Italian male journalists
Mass media people from Milan
Living people